Reiher was a  cargo ship that was built in 1909 by Bremer Vulkan, Bremen, Germany for Argo Line. She was renamed Flamingo in 1938 and was requistioned by the Kriegsmarine in 1939, serving as the vorpostenboot V-109 Flamingo and the sperrbrecher Sperrbrecher 39 and Sperrbrecher 139. She struck a mine and sank off the coast on Norway in February 1945.

Description
The engine was built by Bremer Vulkan, Bremen. It was rated at 179nhp and drove a single screw propeller.

History
Reiher was built in 1909 as Yard Number 531 by Bremer Vulkan, Bremen for Argo Line, Bremen. Her port of registry was Bremen and the Code Letters QJSC were allocated. In 1923, Argo Line merged with the Roland Line to form Dampfschifffahrtsgesellschaft Argo mbH. In December 1924, her captain was fined £10 with 10gns costs at the Thames Police Court, London for an offence under the Merchant Shipping Act 1906, having had an excessive deck cargo of mahogany logs which were improperly stored. Around 1925/26, Dampfschifffahrtsgesellschaft Argo mbH was absorbed by Norddeutscher Lloyd. Reiher was transferred to Argo Reederei AG in 1933.

The transfer was to prevent the gold being seized by the French when Dresden docked at Cherbourg, Manche. Reiher sailed to Bremerhaven with the gold, arriving the next day. In 1934, her Code Letters were changed to DOAU. She was transferred to Argo Reederei Richard Adler in 1937 and was renamed Flamingo in 1938.

On 1 November 1940, Flamingo was requisitoned by the Kriegsmarine for use as a vorpostenboot, serving with 1 Vorpostenbootflottille as V 109 Flamingo. On 26 June 1940, she was transferred to 3 Sperrbrecherflottille serving as Sperrbrecher 39, and from 1941 as Sperrbrecher 139. On 17 February 1945, she struck a mine off Lindesnes, Norway.

References

1909 ships
Ships built in Bremen (state)
Merchant ships of Germany
Steamships of Germany
World War I merchant ships of Germany
World War II merchant ships of Germany
Auxiliary ships of the Kriegsmarine
Maritime incidents in February 1945
Ships sunk by mines
World War II shipwrecks in the North Sea